Fondamente is a commune in the Aveyron department in southern France.

Geography
The village lies on the right bank of the Sorgues, which flows west-southwest through the northern part of the commune.

Population

See also
Communes of the Aveyron department

References

Communes of Aveyron
Aveyron communes articles needing translation from French Wikipedia